Beatrice Merlo (born 23 February 1999) is an Italian professional footballer who plays as a left back for Serie A club Inter Milan and the Italy women's national team.

International career 
Merlo played her first appearance for Italy on 16 June 2021, where they won 3–2 against Austria.

References 

1999 births
Living people
Footballers from Milan
Inter Milan (women) players
Italian women's footballers
Italy women's international footballers
Serie A (women's football) players
Women's association footballers not categorized by position
ASD Femminile Inter Milano players
21st-century Italian women